Aydinlu may refer to:
 Aydinlu, East Azerbaijan
 Aydinlu, West Azerbaijan